Shagun Pandey is an Indian television actor. He made his acting debut with Santoshi Maa as Guddu Parihar. He portrayed Atharv Bapat in Tujhse Hai Raabta (2018) and Uday Kishore Sahani in Kyun Utthe Dil Chhod Aaye (2021). Since 2021, he is seen as Meet Ahlawat in Zee TV's Meet.

Filmography

Television

Films

Music videos

Awards and nominations

References

External links

 

Living people
Indian male television actors
Indian male models
1997 births